1271 Isergina, provisional designation , is a carbonaceous background asteroid from the outer regions of the asteroid belt, approximately 45 kilometers in diameter. It was discovered on 10 October 1931, by Soviet astronomer Grigory Neujmin at the Simeiz Observatory on the Crimean peninsula. The asteroid was named after Crimean physician and friend of the discoverer, Pyotr Isergin.

Orbit and classification 

Isergina is a non-family asteroid from the main belt's background population. It orbits the Sun in the outer asteroid belt at a distance of 2.8–3.5 AU once every 5 years and 7 months (2,039 days; semi-major axis of 3.15 AU). Its orbit has an eccentricity of 0.12 and an inclination of 7° with respect to the ecliptic.

The body's observation arc begins at Simeiz with its official discovery observation in 1931.

Physical characteristics 

In the SMASS classification, Isergina is a carbonaceous C-type asteroid. It has also been characterized as both an X- and L-type by Pan-STARRS photometric survey.

Rotation period 

During 2016–2017, three rotational lightcurves of Isergina were obtained from photometric observations. Lightcurve analysis of the adopted result gave a rotation period of 7.59932 hours with a brightness amplitude between 0.25 and 0.36 magnitude.

Diameter and albedo 

According to the surveys carried out by the Japanese Akari satellite and the NEOWISE mission of NASA's Wide-field Infrared Survey Explorer, Isergina measures between 39.58 and 52.15 kilometers in diameter and its surface has an albedo between 0.031 and 0.08.

The Collaborative Asteroid Lightcurve Link derives an albedo of 0.0677 and a diameter of 44.47 kilometers based on an absolute magnitude of 10.3.

Naming 

This minor planet was named after Crimean physician Pyotr Vasilyevich Isergin (1870–1936), a friend of the discoverer who was treated by him. The author of the Dictionary of Minor Planet Names learned about the naming circumstances from Crimean astronomers I. I. Neyachenko and Galina Kastelʹ (see 3982 Kastelʹ). The official naming citation was mentioned in The Names of the Minor Planets by Paul Herget in 1955.

References

External links 
 Asteroid Lightcurve Database (LCDB), query form (info )
 Dictionary of Minor Planet Names, Google books
 Asteroids and comets rotation curves, CdR – Observatoire de Genève, Raoul Behrend
 Discovery Circumstances: Numbered Minor Planets (1)-(5000) – Minor Planet Center
 
 

001271
Discoveries by Grigory Neujmin
Named minor planets
001271
19311010